Xavier Revil (born 28 May 1971) is a French sailor, who specialized in the multihull (Tornado) class. Together with his partner Christophe Espagnon, he was named one of the country's top sailors in the mixed multihull catamaran for the 2008 Summer Olympics, finishing in a distant eleventh position. Outside his Olympic career, he and Espagnon gave the home crowd a further reason to celebrate with a bronze-medal finish at the 2005 Tornado Worlds in La Rochelle. A member of the local sailing regatta club in his current hometown Annecy, Revil trained most of his competitive sporting career under the tutelage of his personal coach Philippe Neiras.

Revil competed for the French sailing squad, as a 37-year-old skipper in the Tornado class, at the 2008 Summer Olympics in Beijing. Building up their Olympic selection, he and crew member Espagnon finished a credible sixth in the golden fleet phase to lock one of the eleven quota places offered at the 2007 ISAF Worlds in Cascais, Portugal. The French duo started the series with a fantastic top-four mark on the second race; however, a broken halyard lock before race 4 and a wave of unimpressive tenths towards the final stretch bumped Revil and Espagnon out of the medal hunt to eleventh overall by a slight margin, amassing 69 net points.

References

External links 
 
 
 
 
 
 

1971 births
Living people
French male sailors (sport)
Olympic sailors of France
Sailors at the 2008 Summer Olympics – Tornado
People from Saint-Martin-d'Hères
Sportspeople from Isère